The Annunciation is a Hungarian film directed by András Jeles in 1984,  based on The Tragedy of Man (1861) by Imre Madách.

Plot summary
When Adam (Péter Bocsor) and Eve (Júlia Mérő), having succumbed to Lucifer's temptation, are cast out of the Garden of Eden, Adam holds Lucifer (Eszter Gyalog) to his promise, reminding him that "You said I would know everything!". So Lucifer grants Adam a dream of the world to come. In the dream, Adam becomes Djoser in Egypt; Miltiades in Athens; a wealthy Roman during the time of Jesus Christ; a knight called Tancred in Byzantium; Johannes Kepler in Prague; Danton in revolutionary Paris; and a nameless suitor in Victorian London. Guided by a deceptively sweet but ultimately contemptuous Lucifer, Adam confronts an endless procession of the horror of the human story involving rape, betrayal, savagery, mindless cruelty and fanaticism.

Cast

Production
The film is entirely performed by children. It was photographed against the fields, forests, mesas and shores of southern Hungary.  The Annunciation is made in Pasolini style.

See also
 The Tragedy of Man, a 2011 animated film based on the same play

External links
 

1984 films
Hungarian drama films
Hungarian films based on plays
Cultural depictions of Adam and Eve
Cultural depictions of Georges Danton
Cultural depictions of Johannes Kepler
Films set in ancient Egypt
Films set in the 17th century
Films set in the 18th century
The Devil in film

French Revolution films
Films set in the Roman Empire
Films set in the Byzantine Empire
Films set in Prague
Films set in the Holy Roman Empire
Films set in London
Films set in the Victorian era
Films set in Paris